Eldred R. "Salty" Saltwell (April 14, 1924 – May 3, 2020) was the general manager of the Chicago Cubs of Major League Baseball in 1976.

Like a predecessor, John Holland, Saltwell had been a general manager in the minor leagues. He was the GM with minor league affiliates in Des Moines, Iowa, and Los Angeles. Saltwell came to Chicago in 1958 as a business manager. He was very loyal to owner Philip K. Wrigley and was made a vice president in 1972. The Chicago Tribune openly mocked the move and called Saltwell a hot dog vendor. Wrigley defended the decision by stating that Saltwell had the capacity to get rough, especially in contract negotiations. The team would go 75–87 in 1976 with Saltwell as GM. On November 24, 1976, he was reassigned from being the GM, as he was named secretary and director of park operations while field manager Jim Marshall was fired.

Transactions
Saltwell was criticized for a number of rather questionable transactions. His first transaction was on October 28, 1975, when he traded shortstop Don Kessinger to the St. Louis Cardinals for pitcher Mike Garman. Kessinger was the last player remaining from the 1969 Cubs team.

A challenge for Saltwell was that the fall of 1975 ushered in the era of free agency. Pitchers Andy Messersmith and Dave McNally successfully challenged a portion of the MLB Reserve clause.

Saltwell also traded Andre Thornton to the Montreal Expos. In the spring of 1976, Thornton complained about the Cubs' spring training facilities, and feuded with José Cardenal. He was labelled as a troublemaker. On May 17, Saltwell made a deal with the Expos, which was also highly criticized by fans and media alike. In the draft, Saltwell did not have any better luck. Under Saltwell, the Cubs selected pitcher Herman Segelke in the first round of the June draft.

In September 1976, Saltwell was confronted by pitcher Steve Stone. Stone had informed Saltwell of his impending free agency and attempted to get a contract. Saltwell responded by telling Stone that Mr. Wrigley was in the middle of a divorce and he would have to get back to him. Stone opted to leave the Cubs.

One of the most criticized trades was made on February 11, 1977, when the Cubs traded third baseman Bill Madlock and infielder Rob Sperring to the San Francisco Giants for outfielder Bobby Murcer, third baseman Steve Ontiveros and pitcher Andy Muhlstock. Madlock was a two-time defending batting champion who had hit .354 and .339 over the previous two seasons. Saltwell wanted more power and acquired Murcer. After smashing 27 home runs in 1977 with the Cubs, Murcer hit just nine in 1978 and was traded to his original team, the New York Yankees.

Death
Salty Saltwell died on May 3, 2020 at the age of 96.

Executive career

References

People from Illinois
Chicago Cubs executives
Major League Baseball executives
Major League Baseball general managers
1924 births
2020 deaths